The men's 50m freestyle events at the 2022 World Para Swimming Championships were held at the Penteada Olympic Swimming Complex in Madeira between 12–18 June.

Medalists

Results

S3
Heats
15 swimmers from eleven nations took part. The swimmers with the top eight times, regardless of heat, advanced to the final.

Final
The final was held on 16 June 2022.

S4
Heats
12 swimmers from 11 nations took part. The swimmers with the top eight times, regardless of heat, advanced to the final.

Final
The final was held on 16 June 2022.

S5
Heats
11 swimmers from nine nations took part. The swimmers with the top eight times, regardless of heat, advanced to the final.

Final
The final was held on 12 June 2022.

S6
Heats
14 swimmers from eleven nations took part. The swimmers with the top eight times, regardless of heat, advanced to the final.

Final
The final was held on 16 June 2022.

S7
Final
The final was held on 17 June 2022.

S8
Heats
13 swimmers from eleven nations took part. The swimmers with the top eight times, regardless of heat, advanced to the final.

Final
The final was held on 16 June 2022.

S9

S10
Heats
11 swimmers from nine nations took part. The swimmers with the top eight times, regardless of heat, advanced to the final.

Final
The final was held on 12 June 2022.

S11
Heats
14 swimmers from 11 nations took part. The swimmers with the top eight times, regardless of heat, advanced to the final.

Final
The final was held on 12 June 2022.

S12
Final
The final was held on 14 June 2022.

S13
Heats
11 swimmers from 7 nations took part. The swimmers with the top eight times, regardless of heat, advanced to the final.

Final
The final was held on 16 June 2022.

References

2022 World Para Swimming Championships